Mierzęcice  is a village in Będzin County, Silesian Voivodeship, in southern Poland. It is the seat of the gmina (administrative district) called Gmina Mierzęcice.

The village has a population of 2,676.

References

Villages in Będzin County
Piotrków Governorate
Kielce Voivodeship (1919–1939)